Amina Id Abdellah (born 25 January 1971) is a contemporary Moroccan visual artist. She is known for her photo-realistic paintings and drawings of natural environments and phenomena.

Early life
Id Abdellah was born on 25 January 1971 in Marrakesh, Morocco. She moved to Rabat at the age of 10, and began her painting career as a child.

Collections
Amina's works are held in the collections of several public museums, including:
 the Second Forum of Music and Art in the city of Temara.
 Irfan Art Exhibition, Rabat
 Mohammed V University at Souissi.
 Women's Show of Arts, Rabat.
 Russian Cultural Center in Rabat.

References

External links
 Official website

Living people
1971 births
Moroccan artists
People from Marrakesh